Coal Chamber is the debut album by American nu metal band Coal Chamber. It was released on February 11, 1997, by Roadrunner Records and contains the single "Loco". The special edition of the album contains the bonus tracks "Headstones and the Walking Dead", "Big Truck (Hand-On-Wheel Mix)", "Pig (Demo)", "Sway (Demo)", "Unspoiled (Demo)", and "Loco (Demo)" (all of which are available on Giving the Devil His Due). The DVD features two of the band's concerts, a live video of "Loco", and the music video of "Loco".

It has been certified gold by the RIAA, with an excess of 500,000 copies in the United States and is the band's most successful album.

Three singles were released on the album: "Loco", "Big Truck", and "Sway". "Loco" and "Big Truck" were released in 1997, while "Sway" was released in 1998. "Loco", "Big Truck", "Sway", "Oddity", and "Clock" were released on their greatest hits album.

Background 
Coal Chamber formed in Los Angeles during 1993. Guitarist Miguel Rascón described their formation as "your typical how the band formed story. I placed an ad, Dez answered it, then Rayna, then Mike. It's not that I formed the band, but the ad was the seed that started it all." Connections they had to Fear Factory and producer Ross Robinson would help them get signed to Roadrunner Records. Prior to releasing their self-titled debut album in 1997, the band were already known in heavy metal circles for performing at the inaugural edition of Ozzfest in 1996.

Music and lyrics 
The album's sound has been compared to Korn and White Zombie. Regarding potential comparisons to Korn, Rascón stated in an April 1997 interview "We take it as a compliment. Korn's a great band. People have to compare us to something, I guess. We also get White Zombie and Marilyn Manson a lot." The song "Sway" includes the line, "the roof the roof the roof is on fire we don't need no water let the motherfucker burn burn motherfucker burn", which is taken from the song "The Roof Is on Fire" by Rock Master Scott & the Dynamic Three.

About the meaning of the song "Loco", Dez Fafara explains: "That's about living in Los Angeles and just wanting to do something different. And having a persona around myself where people think I'm a little nuts, but really I'm crazy for music. I was living in Los Angeles, trying to come out of that environment after it was totally devastated by hair metal and everything else. No one was going to clubs, there was no real scene in Los Angeles until bands like Coal Chamber and Deftones came out of LA. So that's what 'Loco' is about".

Promotion 
A music video for the single "Loco" was directed by Nathan 'Karma' Cox in October 1997. Cox, a longtime friend of the band, would go on to direct videos for bands such as Disturbed, Linkin Park and Queens of the Stone Age in the early 2000s.

To support the album, Coal Chamber toured heavily throughout the entirety of 1997, sharing the stage with artists such as Anthrax, Danzig, Downset., Faith No More, Grip Inc., Helmet, Machine Head, Pantera, Sevendust, Soilent Green and Type O Negative. In the summer of 1997, they performed at Ozzfest, their second consecutive appearance at the festival. The touring cycle lasted up until mid-1998, after which the band began focusing on a follow up.

Release, reception and legacy 

The album had sales of over 100,000 copies in 1997, selling approximately 3,000 copies a week towards the end of the year.

Chronicles of Chaos writer Adrian Bromley compared it to Korn and Deftones in his March 1997 review, remarking that he had "a hard time telling these bands apart." However, Bromley noted a difference with Coal Chamber was the band's strong sense of groove. AllMusic's Steve Huey gave the album a three star rating. He criticized its riffs and wrote that it wasn't very original. In his AllMusic review for the 2005 CD/DVD reissue, Johnny Loftus labelled "Loco", "Sway" and "Oddity" as "classics of a late-'90s L.A. metal scene that included Korn, Deftones, Fear Factory, and System of a Down." He goes on to say "Coal Chamber couldn't keep it up for a whole album -- Jay Gordon and Jay Baumgardner's enveloping production couldn't hide the limitations in Dez Fafara's lyrics, or the unimaginative two-note guitar riffs. But it's still an interesting listen, especially in relation to what they did differently from their peers. Fafara often sounded like a mascara-eating hybrid of Perry Farrell, Peter Murphy, and Phil Anselmo, and the band's bludgeoning, 'when in doubt, amplify it' approach was kind of endearing."

A 2014 retrospective review on the Rock Sound website states "There is a deeply unsettling sense of awareness from the band, a coldness that stems from knowing damn well that the music they're producing fills a gap in the market, nothing more [...] 'Loco' fails to spark anything more than a knowing sigh as its two-note riff wheezes in, announcing the grim 45 minutes to follow." The review also criticizes the track "Amir of the Desert", claiming "The band even try their hand at some casual racism in 'Amir of the Desert', complete with a 'comedy' indian accent that even the cast of Mrs. Brown's Boys would wince at."

In 2020, it was named one of the 20 best metal albums of 1997 by Metal Hammer magazine.

The album was put at number 15 on Kerrang!s list "The 21 Greatest Nu-Metal Albums of All Time"

In 2021, the album was put on the list of the Revolver magazine "20 Essential Nu-Metal Albums"

Track listing 

On The Complete Roadrunner Collection (1997–2003), "Maricon Puto" and "I" are merged into one track.

The song "Pig" ends at 3:20. After 1 minute and 41 seconds of silence (3:20 – 5:01), begins an untitled hidden track in which Jonathan Davis from Korn talks at the very end.

Special edition 
A special edition of the album was released by Roadrunner in 2005. The package includes the original album with six bonus tracks along with a bonus DVD featuring the "Loco" music video and two live concerts. The concerts are live at the Whisky a Go Go in Los Angeles in 1996, which was included in Kerrang!s 100 greatest gigs of all time, and live at the Maritime Hall in San Francisco, 1999.

Bonus tracks on special edition

Personnel

Coal Chamber 
Dez Fafara – lead vocals
 Miguel Rascón – guitars, backing vocals
 Rayna Foss – bass
 Mike Cox – drums

Additional credits 
 Jay Baumgardner – production, mixing
 Marina Chavez – photography
 CIEL – design
 Monte Conner – production (2005 reissue)
 Giulio Constanzo – art direction (2005 reissue)
 Nathan "Karma" Cox – additional vocals ("Clock")
 Amir Derakh – engineering, mixing
 Laurie Es – additional design (2005 reissue)
 Kevin Estranda – production (2005 reissue), photography (2005 reissue)*
 Jay Gordon – production, mixing, additional vocals ("Oddity" & "Maricon Puto")
 Steven Hartong – assistant production (2005 reissue)
 Ted Jensen – remastering (2005 reissue)
 Eric Levy – additional vocals ("Sway"), additional percussion ("Maricon Puto")
 Lisa Lewis – mixing

Chart performance

Album

Singles

References 

1997 debut albums
Coal Chamber albums
Roadrunner Records albums
Albums produced by Jay Baumgardner

ru:Coal Chamber